Half Magic is a 2018 American comedy film written and directed by Heather Graham. The film stars Graham, Angela Kinsey, Stephanie Beatriz, Thomas Lennon, Luke Arnold, Jason Lewis, Alex Beh, Michael Aronov, Molly Shannon, Rhea Perlman and Chris D'Elia. The film was released in theaters and through video on demand on February 23, 2018, by Momentum Pictures.

Plot
Three women meet each other at a “Divine Feminine" workshop. Honey is a screenwriter who has a casual relationship with Peter, an arrogant action film star who makes misogynistic comments. Eva, a dress designer, is a divorcée whose ex-husband left her for a college student. Free-spirited Candy is in a relationship with Daniel, a TED Talks enthusiast who refuses to be exclusive with her. The three women bond over their shared frustrations and make a pact to date “good guys only” and improve their love lives.

Cast 
Heather Graham as Honey
Angela Kinsey as Eva
Stephanie Beatriz as Candy
Thomas Lennon as Darren	
Luke Arnold as Freedom
Jason Lewis as Mark
Alex Beh as Daniel
Chelsea Mark as Chandra
Michael Aronov as John 
Molly Shannon as Valesca
Rhea Perlman as Linda
Chris D'Elia as Peter
Johnny Knoxville as Father Gary

Production
On June 4, 2015, Angela Kinsey, Chris D'Elia, Jason Lewis and Molly Shannon joined the cast of the film. Principal photography began on June 4, 2015.

Release
The film was released in theaters and through video on demand on February 23, 2018, by Momentum Pictures.

Reception
On Rotten Tomatoes, it has a 62% approval rating based on 34 reviews, with the consensus: "Half Magic never quite fulfills its apparent goals, but this comedy from writer-director-star Heather Graham is still occasionally affably diverting." On Metacritic, the film has a weighted average score of 49 out of 100, based on 9 critics, indicating "mixed or average reviews".

Frank Scheck of The Hollywood Reporter wrote, "Half Magic is a lighthearted ode to female empowerment, and its theatrical release feels perfectly timed to the MeToo movement. While the pic proves too frivolous to make its satirical and social points fully register, it offers diverting pleasures along the way...due to the talents of its appealing female leads, who score consistent laughs, and the well-earned authenticity that Graham brings to the milieu.”

Writing for Variety, Amy Nicholson wrote "Graham’s dialogue is a master class in macho mind-warping where creeps use the language of female empowerment to get what they want.” Nicholson added "Graham’s passion is sincere, even if her tone and rushed pace — the byproduct of cramming in every idea in case she doesn’t get a second chance — teeters on sitcom.”

Wes Greene of Slant Magazine observed, "Through its depiction of the humorous sexual misadventures that Honey, Eva, and Candy endure, Half Magic gets at how any new lifestyle change is accompanied by a period of insecurity and self-doubt", and that "this is a film that understands that not all female desire is the same."

Susan Wloszczyna of RogerEbert.com criticized the film's script as dated and wrote, "'Half Magic' is a stumble backward in its cartoony portrait of modern-day womanhood. But I must give props to Kinsey, whose comic timing, amusing self-deprecation and grounded likability allows her to be the only cast member to come close to resembling an actual human being."

References

External links
 
 Half Magic at AllMovie

2018 films
2018 comedy films
2018 directorial debut films
2010s buddy comedy films
American buddy comedy films
American female buddy films
2010s English-language films
Films scored by Alex Wurman
2010s feminist films
2010s female buddy films
2010s American films